Kirangur  is a village in the southern state of Karnataka, India. It is located in the Srirangapatna taluk of Mandya district in Karnataka.

Demographics
 India census, Kirangur had a population of 7087 with 3549 males and 3538 females.

See also
 Mandya
 Srirangapatna
 Districts of Karnataka

References

External links
 http://Mandya.nic.in/

Villages in Mandya district